Muhammad ibn Zuhayr al-Dabbi was a governor of Egypt for the Abbasid Caliphate, from 789 to 790.

He was appointed to the province by the caliph Harun al-Rashid, with authority over both security and prayers (salah) and taxation (kharaj). His financial director Umar ibn Ghaylan, however, quickly alienated the people of Egypt with a series of unpopular policies, and soon afterwards the local jund staged a revolt over issues of pay. When the caliph learned that Muhammad had refrained from protecting Umar against the jund, he dismissed him from the governorship and replaced him with Dawud ibn Yazid ibn Hatim al-Muhallabi instead.

Notes

References
 
 

Abbasid governors of Egypt
8th-century Abbasid governors of Egypt
8th-century Arabs